Rhynchoconger trewavasae is an eel in the family Congridae (conger/garden eels). It was described by Adam Ben-Tuvia in 1993. It is a marine, deep water-dwelling eel which is known from the western Indian Ocean, including the Gulf of Aqaba and possibly the Gulf of Suez. A single specimen was recorded in the Mediterranean Sea from Israel in 1993.

The species epithet "trewavasae" was given in honour of British ichthyologist Ethelwynn Trewavas. R. trewavasae is sometimes caught in traps and trammel nets.

References

Congridae
Taxa named by Adam Ben-Tuvia
Fish described in 1993